Darije Kalezić (born 1 November 1969) is a Bosnian/Swiss professional football manager and former player He is current head coach Eerste Divisie club of Jong FC Utrecht.

Playing career

Club
Kalezić was born in Pfäffikon, Switzerland. He started his career still in Yugoslavia, then Bosnia and Herzegovina, where he played for 4th tier Lokomotiva when sports director Vahid Halilhodžić brought him to Velež Mostar. When the Bosnian War broke out, he left Mostar and earned a contract with Croatian side NK Neretva and played for them during the Croatian War of Independence. He fled war-torn Croatia for the Netherlands in 1994 and as player being member of FC Den Bosch, RKC Waalwijk, AGOVV Apeldoorn, De Graafschap. He retired in 2006.

Managerial career

De Graafschap
After his retirement from football as a player, Kalezić accepted to stay at De Graafschap as a reserve/youth team coach from 2006 to 2008, and later on being promoted as assistant.

On 25 February 2009, he was appointed interim manager of De Graafschap after previous manager Henk van Stee was dismissed due to poor results. Even though the team relegated at the end of the season, Kalezić was confirmed as head coach for the new season, in which he led the promptly bounce back into the Eredivisie by claiming the 2009–10 Eerste Divisie title. He saved the team from relegation in 2010–11, leaving the club at the end of the season.

Zulte Waregem
In June 2011 he was announced as new head coach of Belgian Pro League club Zulte Waregem. On 27 December 2011, he was fired with Zulte Waregem in 14th place and two places above relegation.

Stockport County
On 24 January 2013, he was announced as manager of Stockport County. He held this position until 20 March 2013 at which point he left the club via mutual consent.

Jong PSV
Ahead of the 2013–14 season, Kalezić was appointed manager of Jong PSV, the reserve side of PSV Eindhoven, for their first season in the Eerste Divisie. Jong PSV finished the 2013–14 Eerste Divisie in 10th place. Kalezić guided the Jong PSV to a 14th-place finish in the 2014/15 Eerste Divisie.

Roda JC
On 11 June 2015, Kalezić was appointed manager of newly promoted Roda JC on a two-year contract. Roda JC finished 14th, 5 points above relegation, on their return to the Eredivisie. Kalezić was sacked on 10 May 2016 after making critical comments against the club's technical director, Ton Caanen.

Al-Taawoun
On 2 June 2016, he was appointed as manager of Saudi club Al-Taawoun. Kalezić was sacked on 15 October 2016 after just five league games in charge.

Wellington Phoenix
On 7 June 2017, he was announced as manager of A-League club Wellington Phoenix. On 1 March 2018, Wellington Phoenix announced that Kalezić would be departing the club at the end of the season after they were not able to come to an agreement on how the club proceeds forward for the next season. A further announcement on 8 March 2018 confirmed he was leaving the club, with a caretaker manager to see out the remainder of the season.

MVV Maastricht
In June 2020, Kalezić was appointed new head coach of Dutch Eerste Divisie club MVV Maastricht. He signed a two-year contract.

Jong FC Utrecht
On 28 May 2021, Kalezić was appointed new head coach of Dutch Eerste Divisie club Jong FC Utrecht. He signed a three-year contract.

Personal life
Kalezić's father is from Montenegro and his mother is from Sanski Most, Bosnia and Herzegovina.  His parents were guest workers in Switzerland when he was born, but they moved back to the Balkans, settling in Mostar when Darije was a child.

Managerial statistics

Honours

As a coach
De Graafschap
Eerste Divisie: 2009-10

PSM Makassar
 Piala Indonesia: 2019

References

1969 births
Living people
People from Pfäffikon, Zürich
Association football defenders
Swiss men's footballers
Swiss football managers
Bosnia and Herzegovina footballers
Bosnia and Herzegovina football managers
Yugoslav footballers
Swiss people of Bosnia and Herzegovina descent
Swiss people of Montenegrin descent
Bosnia and Herzegovina people of Montenegrin descent
FK Velež Mostar players
NK Neretva players
FC Den Bosch players
RKC Waalwijk players
AGOVV Apeldoorn players
De Graafschap players
Yugoslav First League players
First Football League (Croatia) players
Eredivisie players
Eerste Divisie players
Bosnia and Herzegovina expatriate footballers
Expatriate footballers in the Netherlands
Bosnia and Herzegovina expatriate sportspeople in the Netherlands
De Graafschap managers
S.V. Zulte Waregem managers
Stockport County F.C. managers
Roda JC Kerkrade managers
Al-Taawoun FC managers
Wellington Phoenix FC managers
PSM Makassar managers
MVV Maastricht managers
Eerste Divisie managers
Saudi Professional League managers
A-League Men managers
Bosnia and Herzegovina expatriate football managers
Expatriate football managers in the Netherlands
Expatriate football managers in Belgium
Bosnia and Herzegovina expatriate sportspeople in Belgium
Expatriate football managers in England
Bosnia and Herzegovina expatriate sportspeople in England
Expatriate football managers in Saudi Arabia
Bosnia and Herzegovina expatriate sportspeople in Saudi Arabia
Expatriate association football managers in New Zealand
Expatriate football managers in Indonesia
Bosnia and Herzegovina expatriate sportspeople in Indonesia